Elias Nascimento Felício (born 9 February 1992), known as Elias Bidía or Bidía, is a Brazilian footballer who plays for Londrina as a midfielder.

Career statistics

References

External links

Elias Bidia at ZeroZero

1992 births
Living people
Brazilian footballers
Association football midfielders
Campeonato Brasileiro Série B players
Campeonato Brasileiro Série C players
Campeonato Brasileiro Série D players
Londrina Esporte Clube players
Brusque Futebol Clube players
FC Cascavel players
Resende Futebol Clube players